Nafana is a town in northern Ivory Coast. It is a sub-prefecture of Kong Department in Tchologo Region, Savanes District.

Nafana was a commune until March 2012, when it became one of 1126 communes nationwide that were abolished.

In 2014, the population of the sub-prefecture of Nafana was 17,703.

Villages
The 12 villages of the sub-prefecture of Nafana and their population in 2014 are:

Notes

Sub-prefectures of Tchologo
Former communes of Ivory Coast